The Goodall Palm Beach Robin Robin was a golf tournament on the PGA Tour from 1938 to 1957. It was also known as the Goodall Robin Robin and the Palm Beach Robin Robin. The sponsors were the Goodall Company (later Goodall-Sanford Co.) and its subsidiary, the Palm Beach Clothing Co. The purse for the tournament was $5,000, with $1,000 going to the winner, from 1938 to 1941, increased to $10,000/$2,000 in 1946, and increased again to $15,000/$3,000 in 1949. Sam Snead won the event five times including both the first and last events.

Format
The tournament featured an unusual round robin format. From 1938 to 1946, the field consisted of 15 players. They would play seven rounds in five threesomes, a total of 126 holes. A player earned or lost points on each hole, in a match play style, based on his score versus his two opponents for that round. A player scored "+1" for each hole won and "−1" for each hole lost to each opponent. The groups were shuffled after every round so that every player played one round against every other player. The player with the most points after seven rounds won.

In 1947, the tournament's format was altered to feature 16 invitees playing five rounds in groups of four for a total of 90 holes. In 1949, two further changes were made to the format. Up to that time, the committee, after every round, had to calculate the points won or lost on each hole for each match. This had proven difficult to figure out quickly, prompting the switch to a medal match play style where players plus or minus points were based on their medal score (strokes per round).

The cause of the second change was television. In 1949, NBC televised a segment of the event making it the first-ever network telecast of a golf tournament. To accommodate the TV coverage, Wykagyl rearranged the golf course so that the regular ninth hole became the eighteenth hole. The number of spectators at the tournament opening day topped 5,000 people, the largest attendance for any of the Round Robins to that date.

The end of the tournament
After the 1957 event, the Palm Beach Round Robin dropped off the PGA Tour schedule. The majority of the touring pros, those whom no one would include in any select list of 16 players, protested the fairness of an event that forced them to take a week off in the middle of the season while the favored stars enjoyed a good payday.

Tournament hosts
The tournament was played in May or June at a number of different courses, mostly in the New York metropolitan area.

Winners

References

1938 establishments in Ohio
1957 disestablishments in New York (state)
Former PGA Tour events
Golf in Massachusetts
Golf in New York (state)
Golf in Ohio
History of Middlesex County, Massachusetts
Newton, Massachusetts
Sports competitions in Massachusetts
Sports competitions in New York (state)
Sports competitions in Ohio
Sports in Middlesex County, Massachusetts
Sports in New Rochelle, New York
Tourist attractions in Middlesex County, Massachusetts